The 1866–67 Carroll Pioneers men's soccer team represented Carroll University during the 1866–67 college soccer season. The program was retroactively declared national champions by the American Soccer History Archives. This was by the virtue of being the only known college with known results during this time.

During this time, the club played two games, both times against the Waukesha town club. Carroll won the first match, which was played on the County Fairgrounds, while Waukesha won the second. 

By some records, each of the days the matches were played were individual games, where the first team to score a goal won the game. By this metric, the team had a record of 8–7–0, although most record keeping sites declare the team having one win and one loss.

Schedule 

|-
!colspan=6 style="background:#123a80; color:#FFFFFF; border:2px solid #f26422;"| Regular season
|-

See also 
 1860s in American soccer

References

External links 
 1866-67 in American soccer 

Carroll
1866
1866 in sports in Wisconsin
College soccer national championship-winning seasons (1866–1904)